The Serie B 1981–82 was the fiftieth tournament of this competition played in Italy since its creation.

Teams
Reggiana, Cremonese, Cavese and Sambenedettese had been promoted from Serie C, while Brescia, Perugia and Pistoiese had been relegated from Serie A.

Final classification

Results

References and sources

Almanacco Illustrato del Calcio - La Storia 1898-2004, Panini Edizioni, Modena, September 2005

Serie B seasons
2
Italy